Television Educativa, since 2009 known as "Colombeia Televisora Educativa," is an educational television station in Venezuela that is owned and maintained by the INCES (Instituto Nacional de Capacitación y Educación Socialista), a government agency.  It is viewed by people in the rural communities in Venezuela.

In 2007, "Fundación Colombeia" was created, becoming an organization independent from INCES, later becoming part of the Ministry of Education.

See also
List of Venezuelan television channels
Asamblea Nacional Televisión (ANTV)
Avila TV
Buena Televisión
TeleSUR
Venezolana de Televisión (VTV)
ViVe

External links
Old Site 
Official Site 

Television networks in Venezuela
Venezuelan government mass media
Television stations in Venezuela
Educational and instructional television channels
Television channels and stations established in 2009
2009 establishments in Venezuela
Television in Venezuela
Spanish-language television stations